36 may refer to: 
 36 (number), the natural number following 35 and preceding 37
 One of these years of Gregorian or Julian calendars:
 36 BC, 1st century BCE
 AD 36, 1st century
 1936, 20th century
 2036, 21st century

Arts and entertainment
 36 (TV series), an American sports documentary show
 "36", a 2002 song by System of a Down from Steal This Album!
 36 Quai des Orfèvres (film), a 2004 French crime film
 "Thirty Six", a song by Karma to Burn from the album Almost Heathen, 2001